Marcus Valerius Maximus Lactuca was a Roman politician of the fifth century BC. Consul in 456 BC.

Family 
He was a member of the Valerii Maximi, a branch of the powerful Valeria family. He was the grandchildren of Volusus Valerius and the son of the dictator of 494 BC, Manius Valerius Volusus Maximus. With filiation his name would be written Marcus Valerius M'.f. Volusi n. Maximus Lactuca.

He had one known son, Marcus Valerius Lactuca Maximus, the consul suffect in 437 BC.

Biography

Questorship (458) 
In 458 BC, Marcus Valerius was elected quaestor, with Titus Quinctius Capitolinus Barbatus as his colleague. They continued the prosecution against the tribune of the plebs, Marcus Volscius Fictor started by last year's quaestors. Fictor was accused of giving false testimony in the trial of Caeso Quinctius, which had led to Quinctius' exile in 461 BC.

Consulate (456) 
In 456 BC, he was elected consul together with Spurius Verginius Tricostus Caeliomontanus. Their terms of office run during a period of political tension between the plebs represented by the tribunes of the plebs, and the patricians, represented by the senate and the consuls. Valerius and his colleague eventually came to a compromise with the tribunes, which resulted into a new law, known as the Lex Icilia de Aventino publicando, which divided the Aventine Hill into buildable land for the benefit of the commons.

References

5th-century BC Roman consuls